African trypanosomiasis, also known as African sleeping sickness or simply sleeping sickness, is an insect-borne parasitic infection of humans and other animals. It is caused by the species Trypanosoma brucei. Humans are infected by two types, Trypanosoma brucei gambiense (TbG) and Trypanosoma brucei rhodesiense (TbR). TbG causes over 98% of reported cases. Both are usually transmitted by the bite of an infected tsetse fly and are most common in rural areas.

Initially, the first stage of the disease is characterized by fevers, headaches, itchiness, and joint pains, beginning one to three weeks after the bite. Weeks to months later, the second stage begins with confusion, poor coordination, numbness, and trouble sleeping. Diagnosis is by finding the parasite in a blood smear or in the fluid of a lymph node. A lumbar puncture is often needed to tell the difference between first- and second-stage disease. If the disease is not treated quickly it can lead to death.

Prevention of severe disease involves screening the at-risk population with blood tests for TbG. Treatment is easier when the disease is detected early and before neurological symptoms occur. Treatment of the first stage has been with the medications pentamidine or suramin. Treatment of the second stage has involved eflornithine or a combination of nifurtimox and eflornithine for TbG. Fexinidazole is a more recent treatment that can be taken by mouth, for either  stage of TbG. While melarsoprol works for both types, it is typically only used for TbR, due to serious side effects. Without treatment, sleeping sickness typically results in death.

The disease occurs regularly in some regions of sub-Saharan Africa with the population at risk being about 70 million in 36 countries. An estimated 11,000 people are currently infected with 2,800 new infections in 2015. In 2018 there were 977 new cases. In 2015 it caused around 3,500 deaths, down from 34,000 in 1990. More than 80% of these cases are in the Democratic Republic of the Congo. Three major outbreaks have occurred in recent history: one from 1896 to 1906 primarily in Uganda and the Congo Basin, and two in 1920 and 1970, in several African countries. It is classified as a neglected tropical disease. Other animals, such as cows, may carry the disease and become infected in which case it is known as Nagana or animal trypanosomiasis.

Signs and symptoms
African trypanosomiasis symptoms occur in two stages: the hemolymphatic stage and the neurological stage (the latter being characterised by parasitic invasion of the central nervous system). Neurological symptoms occur in addition to the initial features, however, and the two stages may be difficult to distinguish based on clinical features alone.

The disease has been reported to present with atypical symptoms in infected individuals who originate from non-endemic areas (e.g. travelers). The reasons for this are unclear and may be genetic. The low number of such cases may also have skewed findings. In such persons, the infection is said to present mainly as fever with gastrointestinal symptoms (e.g. diarrhoea and jaundice) with lymphadenopathy developing only rarely.

Trypanosomal ulcer

Systemic disease is sometimes presaged by a trypanosomal ulcer developing at the site of the infectious fly bite within 2 days of infection. The ucler is most commonly observed in T. b. rhodesiense infection, and only rarely in T. b. gambiense (however, in T. b. gambiense infection, ulcerss are more common in persons from non-endemic areas).

Hemolymphatic phase 
Incubation period is 1–3 weeks for T. b. rhodesiense, and longer (but less precisely characterised) in T. b. gambiense infection. The first/initial stage, known as the hemolymphatic phase, is characterized by non-specific, generalised symptoms like: fever (intermittent), headaches (severe), joint pains, itching, weakness, malaise, fatigue, weight loss, lymphadenopathy, and hepatosplenomegaly.

Diagnosis may be delayed due to the vagueness of initial symptoms. The disease may also be mistaken for malaria (which may in fact occur as a co-infection).

Intermittent fever

Fever is intermittent, with attacks lasting from a day to a week, separated by intervals of a few days to a month or longer. Episodes of fever become less frequent over the course of the disease.

Lymphadenopathy

Invasion of the circulatory and lymphatic systems by the parasite is associated with severe swelling of lymph nodes, often to tremendous sizes. Posterior cervical lymph nodes are most commonly affected, however, axillary, inguinal, and epitrochlear lymph node involvement may also occur. Winterbottom's sign, the tell-tale swollen lymph nodes along the back of the neck, may appear. Winterbottom's sign is common in T. b. gambiense infection.

Other features

Those affected may additionally present with: skin rash, haemolytic anaemia, hepatomegaly and abnormal liver function, splenomegaly, endocrine disturbance, cardiac involvement (e.g. pericarditis, and congestive heart failure), and ophthalmic involvement.

Neurological phase 
The second phase of the disease, the neurological phase (also called the meningoencephalic stage), begins when the parasite invades the central nervous system by passing through the blood–brain barrier. Progression to the neurological phase occurs after an estimated 21–60 days in case of T. b. rhodesiense infection, and 300–500 days in case of T. b. gambiense infection.

In actuality, the two phases overlap and are difficult to distinguish based on clinical features alone; determining the actual stage of the disease is achieved by examining the cerebrospinal fluid for the presence of the parasite.

Sleep disorders

Sleep-wake disturbances are a leading feature of neurological stage and gave the disease its common name African sleeping sickness. Infected individuals experience a disorganized and fragmented sleep-wake cycle. Those affected experience sleep inversion resulting in daytime sleep and somnolence, and nighttime periods of wakefulness and insomnia. Additionally, those affected also experience episodes of sudden sleepiness.

Neurological/neurocognitive symptoms

Neurological symptoms include: tremor, general muscle weakness, hemiparesis, paralysis of a limb, abnormal muscle tone, gait disturbance, ataxia, speech disturbances, paraesthesia, hyperaesthesia, anaesthesia, visual disturbance, abnormal reflexes, seizures, and coma. Parkinson-like movements might arise due to non-specific movement disorders and speech disorders.

Psychiatric/behavioural symptoms

Individuals may exhibit psychiatric symptoms which may sometimes dominate the clinical diagnosis and may include aggressiveness, apathy, irritability, psychotic reactions and hallucinations, anxiety, emotional lability, confusion, mania, attention deficit, and delirium.

Advanced/late disease and outcomes 
Without treatment, the disease is invariably fatal, with progressive mental deterioration leading to coma, systemic organ failure, and death. An untreated infection with T. b. rhodesiense will cause death within months whereas an untreated infection with T. b. gambiense will cause death after several years. Damage caused in the neurological phase is irreversible.

Cause

Trypanosoma brucei gambiense accounts for the majority of African trypanosomiasis cases, with humans as the main reservoir needed for the transmission, while Trypanosoma brucei rhodesiense is mainly zoonotic, with the occasional human infection. African trypanosomiasis is dependent on the interaction of the parasite (trypanosome) with the tsetse flies (vector), as well as the host (human for Trypanosoma brucei gambiense, and animals for Trypanosoma brucei rhodesiense). The risk of contracting African trypanosomiasis is dependent on coming in contact with an infected tsetse fly.

Trypanosoma brucei

There are two subspecies of the parasite that are responsible for starting the disease in humans. Trypanosoma brucei gambiense causes the diseases in west and central Africa, whereas Trypanosoma brucei rhodesiense has a limited geographical range and is responsible for causing the disease in east and southern Africa. In addition, a third subspecies of the parasite known as Trypanosoma brucei brucei is responsible for affecting animals but not humans.

Humans are the main reservoir for T. b. gambiense but this species can also be found in pigs and other animals. Wild game animals and cattle are the main reservoir of T. b. rhodesiense. These parasites primarily infect individuals in sub-Saharan Africa because that is where the vector (tsetse fly) is located. The two human forms of the disease also vary greatly in intensity. T. b. gambiense causes a chronic condition that can remain in a passive phase for months or years before symptoms emerge and the infection can last about three years before death occurs.

T. b. rhodesiense is the acute form of the disease, and death can occur within months since the symptoms emerge within weeks and it is more virulent and faster developing than T. b. gambiense. Furthermore, trypanosomes are surrounded by a coat that is composed of variant surface glycoproteins (VSG). These proteins act to protect the parasite from any lytic factors that are present in human plasma. The host's immune system recognizes the glycoproteins present on the coat of the parasite leading to the production of different antibodies (IgM and IgG).

These antibodies will then act to destroy the parasites that circulate around the blood. However, from the several parasites present in the plasma, a small number of them will experience changes in their surface coats resulting in the formation of new VSGs. Thus, the antibodies produced by the immune system will no longer recognize the parasite leading to proliferation until new antibodies are created to combat the novel VSGs. Eventually, the immune system will no longer be able to fight off the parasite due to the constant changes in VSGs and infection will arise.

Vector

The tsetse fly (genus Glossina) is a large, brown, biting fly that serves as both a host and vector for the trypanosome parasites. While taking blood from a mammalian host, an infected tsetse fly injects metacyclic trypomastigotes into skin tissue. From the bite, parasites first enter the lymphatic system and then pass into the bloodstream. Inside the mammalian host, they transform into bloodstream trypomastigotes, and are carried to other sites throughout the body, reach other body fluids (e.g., lymph, spinal fluid), and continue to replicate by binary fission.

The entire life cycle of African trypanosomes is represented by extracellular stages. A tsetse fly becomes infected with bloodstream trypomastigotes when taking a blood meal on an infected mammalian host. In the fly's midgut, the parasites transform into procyclic trypomastigotes, multiply by binary fission, leave the midgut, and transform into epimastigotes. The epimastigotes reach the fly's salivary glands and continue multiplication by binary fission.

The entire life cycle of the fly takes about three weeks. In addition to the bite of the tsetse fly, the disease can be transmitted by:
 Mother-to-child infection: the trypanosome can sometimes cross the placenta and infect the fetus.
 Laboratories: accidental infections, for example, through the handling of blood of an infected person and organ transplantation, although this is uncommon.
 Blood transfusion
 Sexual contact
Horse-flies (Tabanidae) and stable flies (Muscidae) possibly play a role in transmission of nagana (the animal form of sleeping sickness) and the human disease form.

Pathophysiology 
Tryptophol is a chemical compound produced by the trypanosomal parasite in sleeping sickness which induces sleep in humans.

Diagnosis

The gold standard for diagnosis is identification of trypanosomes in a sample by microscopic examination. Samples that can be used for diagnosis include ulcer fluid, lymph node aspirates, blood, bone marrow, and, during the neurological stage, cerebrospinal fluid. Detection of trypanosome-specific antibodies can be used for diagnosis, but the sensitivity and specificity of these methods are too variable to be used alone for clinical diagnosis. Further, seroconversion occurs after the onset of clinical symptoms during a T. b. rhodesiense infection, so is of limited diagnostic use.

Trypanosomes can be detected from samples using two different preparations. A wet preparation can be used to look for the motile trypanosomes. Alternatively, a fixed (dried) smear can be stained using Giemsa's or Field's technique and examined under a microscope. Often, the parasite is in relatively low abundance in the sample, so techniques to concentrate the parasites can be used prior to microscopic examination. For blood samples, these include centrifugation followed by examination of the buffy coat; mini anion-exchange/centrifugation; and the quantitative buffy coat (QBC) technique. For other samples, such as spinal fluid, concentration techniques include centrifugation followed by examination of the sediment.

Three serological tests are also available for detection of the parasite: the micro-CATT (card agglutination test for trypanosomiasis), wb-CATT, and wb-LATEX. The first uses dried blood, while the other two use whole blood samples. A 2002 study found the wb-CATT to be the most efficient for diagnosis, while the wb-LATEX is a better exam for situations where greater sensitivity is required.

Prevention

Currently there are few medically related prevention options for African trypanosomiasis (i.e. no vaccine exists for immunity). Although the risk of infection from a tsetse fly bite is minor (estimated at less than 0.1%), the use of insect repellants, wearing long-sleeved clothing, avoiding tsetse-dense areas, implementing bush clearance methods and wild game culling are the best options to avoid infection available for local residents of affected areas.

In July 2000, a resolution was passed to form the Pan African Tsetse and Trypanosomiasis Eradication Campaign (PATTEC). The campaign works to eradicate the tsetse vector population levels and subsequently the protozoan disease, by use of insecticide-impregnated targets, fly traps, insecticide-treated cattle, ultra-low dose aerial/ground spraying (SAT) of tsetse resting sites and the sterile insect technique (SIT). The use of SIT in Zanzibar proved effective in eliminating the entire population of tsetse flies but was expensive and is relatively impractical to use in many of the endemic countries afflicted with African trypanosomiasis.

A pilot program in Senegal has reduced the tsetse fly population by as much as 99% by introducing male flies which have been sterilized by exposure to gamma rays.

Regular active surveillance, involving detection and prompt treatment of new infections, and tsetse fly control is the backbone of the strategy used to control sleeping sickness. Systematic screening of at-risk communities is the best approach, because case-by-case screening is not practical in endemic regions. Systematic screening may be in the form of mobile clinics or fixed screening centres where teams travel daily to areas of high infection rates. Such screening efforts are important because early symptoms are not evident or serious enough to warrant people with gambiense disease to seek medical attention, particularly in very remote areas. Also, diagnosis of the disease is difficult and health workers may not associate such general symptoms with trypanosomiasis. Systematic screening allows early-stage disease to be detected and treated before the disease progresses, and removes the potential human reservoir. A single case of sexual transmission of West African sleeping sickness has been reported.

Treatment

First stage
The treatment for first-stage disease is fexinidazole by mouth or pentamidine by injection for T. b. gambiense. Suramin by injection is used for T. b. rhodesiense.

Second stage
Fexinidazole may be used for the second stage of TbG, if the disease is not severe. Otherwise a regimen involving the combination of nifurtimox and eflornithine, nifurtimox-eflornithine combination treatment (NECT), or eflornithine alone appear to be more effective and result in fewer side effects. These treatments may replace melarsoprol when available. NECT has the benefit of requiring less injections of eflornithine.

Intravenous melarsoprol was previously the standard treatment for second-stage (neurological phase) disease and is effective for both types. Melarsoprol is the only treatment for second stage T. b. rhodesiense; however, it causes death in 5% of people who take it. Resistance to melarsoprol can occur.

Prognosis
If untreated, T. b. gambiense almost always results in death, with only a few individuals shown in a long-term 15 year follow-up to have survived after refusing treatment. T. b. rhodesiense, being a more acute and severe form of the disease, is consistently fatal if not treated. Disease progression greatly varies depending on disease form. For individuals which are infected by T. b. gambiense, which accounts for 98% of all of the reported cases, a person can be infected for months or even years without signs or symptoms until the advanced disease stage, where it is too late to be treated successfully. For individuals affected by T. b. rhodesiense, which accounts for 2% of all reported cases, symptoms appear within weeks or months of the infection. Disease progression is rapid and invades the central nervous system, causing death within a short amount of time.

Epidemiology

In 2010, it caused around 9,000 deaths, down from 34,000 in 1990. As of 2000, the disability-adjusted life-years (9 to 10 years) lost due to sleeping sickness are 2.0 million. From 2010 to 2014, there was an estimated 55 million people at risk for gambiense African Trypanosomiasis and over 6 million people at risk for rhodesiense African trypanosomiasis. In 2014, the World Health Organization reported 3,797 cases of Human African Trypanosomiasis when the predicted number of cases were to be 5,000. The number of total reported cases in 2014 is an 86% reduction to the total number of cases reported in 2000.

The disease has been recorded as occurring in 37 countries, all in sub-Saharan Africa. It occurs regularly in southeast Uganda and western Kenya, and killed more than 48,000 Africans in 2008. The Democratic Republic of the Congo is the most affected country in the world, accounting for 75% of the Trypanosoma brucei gambiense cases. The population at risk being about 69 million with one third of this number being at a 'very high' to 'moderate' risk and the remaining two thirds at a 'low' to 'very low' risk. The number of people being affected by the disease has declined. At this rate, sleeping sickness elimination is a possibility. The World Health Organization plans to eradicate sleeping sickness by 2030.

History

The condition has been present in Africa for thousands of years. Because of a lack of travel between indigenous people, sleeping sickness in humans had been limited to isolated pockets. This changed after Arab slave traders entered central Africa from the east, following the Congo River, bringing parasites along. Gambian sleeping sickness travelled up the Congo River, and then further east.

An Arab writer of the 14th century left the following description in the case of a sultan of the Mali Kingdom: "His end was to be overtaken by the sleeping sickness (illat an-nawm) which is a disease that frequently befalls the inhabitants of these countries especially their chieftains. Sleep overtakes one of them in such a manner that it is hardly possible to awake him."

The British naval surgeon John Atkins described the disease on his return from West Africa in 1734:

French naval surgeon Marie-Théophile Griffon du Bellay treated and described cases while stationed aboard the hospital ship Caravane in Gabon in the late 1860s.

In 1901, a devastating epidemic erupted in Uganda, killing more than 250,000 people, including about two-thirds of the population in the affected lakeshore areas. According to The Cambridge History of Africa, "It has been estimated that up to half the people died of sleeping-sickness and smallpox in the lands on either bank of the lower river Congo."

The causative agent and vector were identified in 1903 by David Bruce, and the subspecies of the protozoa were differentiated in 1910. Bruce had earlier shown that T. brucei was the cause of a similar disease in horses and cattle that was transmitted by the tsetse fly (Glossina morsitans).

The first effective treatment, atoxyl, an arsenic-based drug developed by Paul Ehrlich and Kiyoshi Shiga, was introduced in 1910, but blindness was a serious side effect.

Suramin was first synthesized by Oskar Dressel and Richard Kothe in 1916 for Bayer. It was introduced in 1920 to treat the first stage of the disease. By 1922, Suramin was generally combined with tryparsamide (another pentavalent organoarsenic drug), the first drug to enter the nervous system and be useful in the treatment of the second stage of the gambiense form. Tryparsamide was announced in the Journal of Experimental Medicine in 1919 and tested in the Belgian Congo by Louise Pearce of the Rockefeller Institute in 1920. It was used during the grand epidemic in West and Central Africa on millions of people and was the mainstay of therapy until the 1960s. American medical missionary Arthur Lewis Piper was active in using tryparsamide to treat sleeping sickness in the Belgian Congo in 1925.

Pentamidine, a highly effective drug for the first stage of the disease, has been used since 1937. During the 1950s, it was widely used as a prophylactic agent in western Africa, leading to a sharp decline in infection rates. At the time, eradication of the disease was thought to be at hand.

The organoarsenical melarsoprol (Arsobal) developed in the 1940s is effective for people with second-stage sleeping sickness. However, 3–10% of those injected have reactive encephalopathy (convulsions, progressive coma, or psychotic reactions), and 10–70% of such cases result in death; it can cause brain damage in those who survive the encephalopathy. However, due to its effectiveness, melarsoprol is still used today. Resistance to melarsoprol is increasing, and combination therapy with nifurtimox is currently under research.

Eflornithine (difluoromethylornithine or DFMO), the most modern treatment, was developed in the 1970s by Albert Sjoerdsma and underwent clinical trials in the 1980s. The drug was approved by the United States Food and Drug Administration in 1990. Aventis, the company responsible for its manufacture, halted production in 1999. In 2001, Aventis, in association with Médecins Sans Frontières and the World Health Organization, signed a long-term agreement to manufacture and donate the drug.

In addition to sleeping sickness, previous names have included negro lethargy, maladie du sommeil (Fr), Schlafkrankheit (Ger), African lethargy, and Congo trypanosomiasis.

Research
The genome of the parasite has been sequenced and several proteins have been identified as potential targets for drug treatment. Analysis of the genome also revealed the reason why generating a vaccine for this disease has been so difficult. T. brucei has over 800 genes that make proteins the parasite "mixes and matches" to evade immune system detection.

Using a genetically modified form of a bacterium that occurs naturally in the gut of the vectors is being studied as a method of controlling the disease.

Recent findings indicate that the parasite is unable to survive in the bloodstream without its flagellum. This insight gives researchers a new angle with which to attack the parasite.

Trypanosomiasis vaccines are undergoing research.

Additionally, the Drugs for Neglected Diseases Initiative has contributed to the African sleeping sickness research by developing a compound called fexinidazole. This project was originally started in April 2007 and enrolled 749 people in the DRC and Central African Republic. The results showed efficacy and safety in both stages of the disease, both in adults and children ≥ 6 years old and weighing ≥ 20 kg. The European Medicines Agency approved it for first and second stage disease outside of Europe in November 2018. The treatment was approved in the DRC in December 2018.

Funding
For current funding statistics, human African trypanosomiasis is grouped with kinetoplastid infections. Kinetoplastids refer to a group of flagellate protozoa. Kinetoplastid infections include African sleeping sickness, Chagas' disease, and Leishmaniasis. All together, these three diseases accounted for 4.4 million disability adjusted life years (DALYs) and an additional 70,075 recorded deaths yearly. For kinetoplastid infections, the total global research and development funding was approximately $136.3 million in 2012. Each of the three diseases, African sleeping sickness, Chagas' disease, and Leishmaniasis each received approximately a third of the funding, which was about $36.8 million US dollars, $38.7 million US dollars, and $31.7 million US dollars, respectively.

For sleeping sickness, funding was split into basic research, drug discovery, vaccines, and diagnostics. The greatest amount of funding was directed towards basic research of the disease; approximately $21.6 million US dollars was directed towards that effort. As for therapeutic development, approximately $10.9 million was invested.

The top funder for kinetoplastid infection research and development are public sources. About 62% of the funding comes from high-income countries while 9% comes from low- and middle-income countries. High-income countries' public funding is the largest contributor to the neglected disease research effort. However, in recent years, funding from high-income countries has been steadily decreasing; in 2007, high-income countries provided 67.5% of the total funding whereas, in 2012, high-income countries public funds only provided 60% of the total funding for kinetoplastid infections. This downwards trend leaves a gap for other funders, such as philanthropic foundations and private pharmaceutical companies to fill.

Much of the progress that has been made in African sleeping sickness and neglected disease research as a whole is a result of the other non-public funders. One of these major sources of funding has come from foundations, which have increasingly become more committed to neglected disease drug discovery in the 21st century. In 2012, philanthropic sources provided 15.9% of the total funding. The Bill and Melinda Gates Foundation has been a leader in providing funding for neglected disease drug development. They have provided $444.1 million US dollars towards neglected disease research in 2012. To date, they have donated over $1.02 billion US dollars towards the neglected disease discovery efforts.

For kinetoplastid infections specifically, they have donated an average of $28.15 million US dollars annually between the years 2007 to 2011. They have labeled human African trypanosomiasis a high-opportunity target meaning it is a disease that presents the greatest opportunity for control, elimination, and eradication, through the development of new drugs, vaccines, public-health programs, and diagnostics. They are the second-highest funding source for neglected diseases, immediately behind the US National Institutes of Health. At a time where public funding is decreasing and government grants for scientific research are harder to obtain, the philanthropic world has stepped in to push the research forward.

Another important component of increased interest and funding has come from industry. In 2012, they contributed 13.1% total to the kinetoplastid research and development effort, and have additionally played an important role by contributing to public-private partnerships (PPP) as well as product-development partnerships (PDP). A public-private partnership is an arrangement between one or more public entities and one or more private entities that exists to achieve a specific health outcome or to produce a health product. The partnership can exist in numerous ways; they may share and exchange funds, property, equipment, human resources, and intellectual property. These public-private partnerships and product-development partnerships have been established to address challenges in pharmaceutical industry, especially related to neglected disease research. These partnerships can help increase the scale of the effort towards therapeutic development by using different knowledge, skills, and expertise from different sources. These types of partnerships have been shown to be more effective than industry or public groups working independently.

Other animals and reservoir

Trypanosoma of both the rhodesiense and gambiense types can affect other animals such as cattle and wild animals. African trypanosomiasis has generally been considered an anthroponotic disease and thus its control program was mainly focused on stopping the transmission by treating human cases and eliminating the vector. However, animal reservoirs were reported to possibly play an important role in the endemic nature of African trypanosomiasis, and for its resurgence in the historic foci of West and Central Africa.

References

External links 

 
 
 Links to pictures of Sleeping Sickness (Hardin MD/ University of Iowa)
 

Health in Africa
Insect-borne diseases
Parasitic diseases
Protozoal diseases
Wikipedia medicine articles ready to translate
Wikipedia infectious disease articles ready to translate
Sleep disorders
Tropical diseases
Zoonoses
African trypanosomiasis